Arnaud di Pasquale was the defending champion, but did not compete this year.

Olivier Rochus won the title by defeating Diego Nargiso 7–6(16–14), 6–1 in the final.

Seeds

Draw

Finals

Top half

Bottom half

References

External links
 Official results archive (ATP)
 Official results archive (ITF)

Campionati Internazionali di Sicilia
2000 ATP Tour
Camp